Meletios Kalamaras, (28 September 1933 – 21 June 2012) was an Orthodox bishop. He served as Metropolitan of Nicopolis & Preveza for 32 years. He was appointed on 26 February 1980 and held the office until his death, 21 June 2012.

Short biography
Metropolitan Meletios was born in Alagonia, Messinia, Peloponnese, Greece, on September 28, 1933.

He studied at the University of Athens and graduated with a BA in Theology and a BA in Philology-Philosophy.

He was tonsured a monk at the age of 21 and was ordained a deacon immediately after, on December 28, 1954, by the Metropolitan of Messinia . The same bishop ordained him priest on August 20, 1959.

He was Preacher of the Holy Metropolis of Messinia from 1957 to 1967 and Secretary of the Holy Synod of the Church of Greece on Orthodox and Inter-Church Relations from 1968 to 1980.

He was elected Metropolitan of Nicopolis and Preveza on February 26, 1980, consecrated a bishop on March 1, 1980, and enthroned in his  diocese on March 28 of the same year. He had a clear vision of his pastoral responsibility, Woe is unto me, if I preach not the Gospel, and he firmly believed that the main task of priesthood, and especially of high priesthood, has to be the teaching of faith. Thus, he always taught the Gospel in a simple way, he wrote several teaching books and translated the texts of the Gospel into Modern Greek, so that they would be easier understood by the modern Greek Christians.

Meletios insisted that the Church is a divine mystery and must be understood as such. When the human element outweighs the divine, the Church does not flourish. Anthropocentrism, wrote Bishop Meletios in 2001, kills the Church and its life. He was especially well known for his transformative work in the Diocese of Nicopolis & Preveza, which was captured in a book by S.R. Lloyd-Moffet.

He was the author of many books. His meticulous study of The Fifth Ecumenical Council was awarded the prize of the Academy of Athens. This study is a great contribution to the Greek-language theological science, as with the translation of the Latin proceedings of the Fifth Ecumenical Council, it became possible to understand the deeds and efforts for the unity of the Church, made by the emperor Justinian and the fathers of the council.

His body lay in state in the church of Saints Constantine and Helen in Preveza. Clergy and people paid the last tribute to their pastor of 32 years in the same church, on Saturday, June 23, 2012, where the funeral service was held, conducted by the eminent archbishop of Athens Hieronymos II, in the presence of 18 metropolitans and 4 bishops. He was buried in the courtyard of the same church.

Layman (1933-1954)
Meletios Kalamaras was born in Alagonia, a small Peloponnesian village, near the summit of the Taygetos mountain, near Kalamata in the region of Messinia, southwestern Greece, on September 28, 1933. He was the ninth of eleven children of doctor Agesilaos Kalamaras and Eleni Vassilakis. He lived for a while in Alagonia and for a few years in Kalamata. In 1947 he went to Athens to study in the then eight-grade high school, where he lived with his aunt Evangelia, his father's cousin, who daily read the Greetings and Supplications to the Virgin Mary. The Virgin Mary, the pure and immaculate vessel of light, enlightened, through her Son, His little servant Meletios (he had this name from his baptism) to seek the things above and not the things on earth.

Fascinated by a prophetic life, in the sense of preaching the precepts of Jesus, the University School of Theology was the obvious continuation, after graduating from High School.

He graduated from the University of Athens School of Theology, where he studied from 1950 to 1954, as well as from the School of Philosophy of the same university, where he studied from 1954 to 1957.

Deacon (1954-1959)
On December 28, 1954, at the age of 21, he was institutionally dedicated to Christ as a monk in the Holy Monastery of Zoodochos Pigi , Messinia, after the relative blessing from the Metropolitan of Messinia Chrysostomos Daskalakis. The brilliant bishop recognised Meletios' abilities and ordained him a deacon soon after, while he was still at the monastery. The few Kollyvades monks who kept the monastery, the abbot Alexandros, and the monks Ambrosios, Polykarpos, his beloved Hieronymos, and Pangratios, prepared the soil for the young Father Meletios. By that time, he knew all the forms of Ancient Greek so perfectly that he could write a two-page sentence in ancient Greek. He spoke Latin as his mother tongue, and at the same time he understood perfectly and spoke Russian, French, German and English fluently. Therefore, Chrysostomos took him from the monastery and he brought him to Kalamata in 1957.

Priest (1959-1980)

He was a preacher in Kalamata from 1957 to 1967. He was ordained to the priesthood on August 20, 1959, by the Metropolitan of Messinia Chrysostomos I, whom he followed. In Kalamata, his life was influenced by the enormous personalities which already dominated the city, Father  (1901–1966), and Father Agathangelos Michaelidis (1908–1991), a priest from Asia Minor, protosyncellus at that time of the Metropolitan of Messinia Chrysostomos.

In Athens he was vicar of the church of St Eleftherios, near . Every Wednesday and Saturday he confessed in the minstrels' gallery of the church. The priests of the church had a special love for Father Meletios, as he respected them, did not ask anything of them, did not interfere "at their feet" and improved and elevated the quality of the pastoral atmosphere. At the Patision Student Hostel, which was near to his house, he organised meetings with students, and conducted the Great Lent Salutations to the Theotokos in the hostel's chapel. Many young students from both the church and the hostel confessed to him, several of whom formed the original dough of the Prophet Elias Monastery in Flamboura, Preveza, northwestern Greece.

While he was preparing with his spiritual children to revive the almost deserted Dochiariou Monastery in Mount Athos, there came the upheaval and disruption of his election as Metropolitan of Nicopolis and Preveza, at the request of Father , Metropolitan of Katerini. Therefore, Father Meletios sacrificed himself for the local Church of Preveza to prosper again. Thus, the remark of the writer Virgil Gheorghiu applied to him: The priest is not a human, but the sacrifice of a human that is added to the sacrifice of Christ. This is priesthood. Throughout his priestly life and with his whole life, Father Meletios demonstrated exactly this.

Bishop (1980-2012)

On February 26, 1980, the Holy Synod of the Church of Greece considered three candidates for the vacant See of the Metropolis of Nicopolis and Preveza: Archimandrite , who later was elected Metropolitan of Argolis, Archimandrite , then protosyncellus of the Metropolis of Nicopolis and Preveza, and Archimandrite Meletios Kalamaras. They elected the latter as the next Bishop of Nicopolis and Preveza.

Meletios was consecrated bishop on Saturday, March 1, 1980, in his parish church, St. Eleftherios at Gyzi, in Athens, in the presence of eleven bishops from the Church of Greece, the Metropolitan of Nubia, and the Archbishop of Sinai.

In his ordination speech, he called upon the Cross of Christ and he compared the priesthood to the Cross of Christ. In his homily, he said, amongst other things: "O, Cross of Christ, all-holy, thrice-blessed, and life-giving, instrument of the mystical rites of Zion, the Holy Altar for the service of our Great Archpriest, the blessing, the weapon, the strength of priests, our pride, our consolation, the light in our heart, our mind, and our steps; Our Lord and Saviour nailed to you revealed and instigated His priesthood for us. For this also, the priesthood saves and glorifies only as a Cross; only the one who bears it radiates virtue, which the Cross symbolises and inspires, illumines and sanctifies; only when it has something from God and the inexpressible beauty of the virtues of the first and great priest, Christ".  

Father Meletios and five of his spiritual children came to Preveza on March 28, 1980, which fell on the Friday before Palm Sunday. He was called to "plant" a church, in a difficult, small provincial town, scarred by its past. He worked without the familiar pretentious images of antiquated piety or feigned modesty, without empty and futile sermons, meaningless moralisms or compulsive dilemmas of clerical certainties. He worked with methodical cultivation of souls, with honesty and sincere acts of love. He worked with a clean, simple but also sharp speech: with a yes be yes, and a no, no. A pure speech that came from a pure face and expressed a pure soul. He worked with tradition as freedom rather than obligation, as responsibility rather than complacency, to speak to and relieve the afflicted and desperate man of the modern age. And he built a church, not an organisation of fruitless activism nor a hoard of followers of sick old age, nor a social institution for the preservation of Christian customs or linguistic stereotypes, but a practical response to the daily search for the meaning of life, a living signpost of the road that frees us.

When he arrived in Preveza, his aim and effort was for the words to acquire their lost credibility. Priest should mean a caring father and not a "milking" employee. The church to become and be the Christian's home. The church to be the embrace of Christ in which people feel the warmth of the living parental body.

The goals he set as of the first day he arrived in Preveza were:
To restore the spiritual integrity and authenticity of the clergy,
To restore the church experience from a spiritual, traditional and aesthetic point of view,
To assemble the faithful into members of the One Body of Christ,
To re-educate the people,
To establish a model of monastic life.

During all the years of his ministry in the Diocese of Nicopolis and Preveza, he suffered along with those who sin, and fished them through the Cross, to which they saw that he was nailed. He didn't just suggest the Cross. He showed it with his own crucifixion. Thus, the hymn of Romanos the Melodist applied to Father Meletios: Peter, do you love me? Then, do as I say, shepherd my sheep and love those I do; learn by suffering along with those who sin, see my mercy towards you and fish through the Cross.

He had a readiness of mind, and the right "timing" for a joke, but he was always serious in matters of faith and the duties assigned to him. He recognised the weight of the high office of being a shepherd of the faithful, and a successor of the Apostles, but he walked humbly among the people, without any pretense. Although he knew ten languages and had written treatises of high theological level, he never displayed his knowledge and preferred simplicity in his speech. He was extremely ascetic and morally disciplined, yet showed sympathy and tolerance to those he met. He abhorred political and economic activity, but handled it with foresight when it was to benefit the people spiritually. These characteristics existed in rare combination in Bishop Meletios.

Meletios and Monastic life
Throughout his life Father Meletios was a true monk. Coming to Preveza and having the responsibility of priesthood in the Diocese of Nicopolis & Preveza, he naturally realized the need for monasticism, as an expression of the authenticity and freedom of the Church of Christ from conventional and seasonal forms. A dozen monks already lived near him, as well as others intending to become monks. There was no male monasticism in the Metropolis and the women's monastery of St Dimitrios at Zalongo housed a solitary elderly nun.

A marble bust

On July 3, 2021, a marble bust of Father Meletios was erected in Preveza. The bust is the work of the sculptor Vangelis Rinas. Despite the fact that the artist had not created sculptured busts of people before, he undertook the task of creating the figure of Father Meletios, after he saw photographs of him. Meletios' bust was sculpted out of white Dionysos marble in 2020, but due to the conditions caused by the pandemic, it was placed the following year, in the open space outside the Spiritual Centre of the Diocese of Preveza, which Meletios had himself created. Spiritual children of the late metropolitan, clergy and laymen, undertook the entire cost of the bust, as well as the formation of the space where it was placed.

Subnotes

Bibliographical references

Bibliography

External links
 Homily of Bishop Meletios on the Feast of Orthodoxy, Athens Cathedral. 1st part (8.3.2009) (in Greek)
 Homily of Bishop Meletios on the Feast of Orthodoxy, Athens Cathedral. 2nd part  (8.3.2009) (in Greek)
 The text of Meletios' homily on the Feast of Orthodoxy (8.3.2009) (in Greek)
 Meletios Kalamaras, Metropolitan of Nicopolis & Preveza, «Does a Christian differ from a non Christian?» (in Greek) (access: 10 June 2021)
 Meletios' last Good Friday sermon at the "Epitaph circumambulation" in Preveza's square (22.4.2011) (in Greek)
 The Farewell of the clergy of the Diocese of Preveza to their Father (23.6.2012) (in Greek)
 Bishop Meletios' funeral by 4Ε (23.6.2012)
 fr. , What did Meletios Kalamaras offer to Preveza?, Preveza, 21.6.2014 (in Greek)
 fr. Antonios Pinakoulas, The inheritance of fr. Meletios, Athens, 17 May 2017 (in Greek)

Church of Greece
Bishops of the Church of Greece
20th-century Eastern Orthodox bishops
Greek bishops
People from Kalamata
Preveza
Greek writers
Greek religious writers
Greek religious leaders
Metropolitans of Preveza
Lists of Eastern Orthodox bishops and archbishops
Eastern Orthodox metropolitans
Metropolitans of the Greek Orthodox Church
Greek Orthodox clergy
Greek clergy
1933 births
2012 deaths